Patania ultimalis is a moth in the family Crambidae. It was described by Francis Walker in 1859. It is found in Sri Lanka, Myanmar, Japan, Taiwan and Australia.

The larvae feed on Idesia polycarpa.

References

Moths described in 1859
Moths of Australia
Moths of Asia
Moths of Japan
Moths of Sri Lanka
Moths of Taiwan
Spilomelinae
Taxa named by Francis Walker (entomologist)